EN 14214 is a standard published by the European Committee for Standardization that describes the requirements and test methods for FAME - the most common type of biodiesel.

The technical definition of biodiesel is a fuel suitable for use in compression ignition (diesel) engines that is made of fatty acid monoalkyl esters derived from biologically produced oils or fats including vegetable oils, animal fats and microalgal oils. When biodiesel is produced from these types of oil using methanol fatty acid methyl esters (FAME) are produced. Biodiesel fuels can also be produced using other alcohols, for example using ethanol to produce fatty acid ethyl esters, however these types of biodiesel are not covered by EN 14214 which applies only to methyl esters i.e. biodiesel produced using methanol.

This European Standard exists in three official versions - English, French, German. The current version of the standard was published in November 2008 and supersedes EN 14214:2003.

Differences exist between the national versions of the EN 14214 standard. These differences relate to cold weather requirements and are detailed in the national annex of each standard.

It is broadly based on the earlier German standard DIN 51606. The ASTM and EN standards both recommend very similar methods for the GC based analyses.

Blends are designated as "B" followed by a number indicating the percentage biodiesel. For example: B100 is pure biodiesel.  B99 is 99% biodiesel, 1% petrodiesel.  B20 is 20% biodiesel and 80% fossil diesel.

Specifications

See also 
 ASTM D6751 — the standard used in USA and Canada
 EN
 EN 590
 List of EN standards

References

External links 
 CEN homepage 
 Country specific CFPP requirements according to national annexes of EN 14214
 
14214
Biodiesel